Pendleton County is a county located in the U.S. state of Kentucky. As of the 2020 census, the population was 14,644. Its county seat is Falmouth. The county was founded December 13, 1798.
Pendleton County is included in the Cincinnati-Middletown, OH-KY-IN Metropolitan Statistical Area.

History
Pendleton County was created from parts of Campbell and Bracken counties in 1798. The county was named after Edmund Pendleton, a longtime member of the Virginia House of Burgesses, the Continental Congress and chief justice of Virginia.

Falmouth, the future county seat, began as a settlement called Forks of Licking,  1776.

Falmouth was chartered in 1793. Its name originated from the Virginians who settled there from Falmouth, Virginia. It was also in 1793 that one of the first sawmills in Kentucky was built in Falmouth. Falmouth was designated the county seat in 1799. The county courthouse was erected in 1848.

During the American Civil War, the county sent men to both armies. A Union Army recruiting camp was established in Falmouth in September 1861. Two Confederate recruiters were captured and executed by the Union Army in the Peach Grove area of northern Pendleton County. In July 1862, a number of county citizens were rounded up by Union troops during a crackdown against suspected Confederate sympathizers. In June 1863, a number of women were arrested at Demossville because they were believed to be potential spies dangerous to the Federal government. Falmouth was the site of a small skirmish on September 18, 1862, between twenty-eight Confederates and eleven Home Guardsmen.

The city of Butler was established  1852 when the Kentucky Central Railroad was built through the area. The city was named for William O. Butler, U.S. congressman from the area, when it was incorporated on February 1, 1868.

Geography
The county's northeastern border with Ohio is formed by the Ohio River.

Adjacent counties
 Kenton County  (northwest)
 Campbell County  (north)
 Clermont County, Ohio  (northeast)
 Bracken County  (east)
 Harrison County  (south)
 Grant County  (west)

Demographics

As of the census of 2000, there were 14,390 people, 5,170 households, and 3,970 families residing in the county. The racial makeup of the county was 98.39% White, 0.49% Black or African American, 0.19% Native American, 0.11% Asian, 0.01% Pacific Islander, 0.35% from other races, and 0.44% from two or more races. 0.67% of the population were Hispanic or Latino of any race.

There were 5,170 households, out of which 39.00% had children under the age of 18 living with them, 62.80% were married couples living together, 9.60% had a female householder with no husband present, and 23.20% were non-families. 20.10% of all households were made up of individuals, and 8.30% had someone living alone who was 65 years of age or older. The average household size was 2.75 and the average family size was 3.14.

In the county, the population was spread out, with 28.40% under the age of 18, 8.50% from 18 to 24, 31.20% from 25 to 44, 21.50% from 45 to 64, and 10.40% who were 65 years of age or older. The median age was 34 years. For every 100 females there were 100.30 males. For every 100 females age 18 and over, there were 97.90 males.

The median income for a household in the county was $38,125, and the median income for a family was $42,589. Males had a median income of $31,885 versus $23,234 for females. The per capita income for the county was $16,551. About 9.80% of families and 11.40% of the population were below the poverty line, including 14.80% of those under age 18 and 11.60% of those age 65 or over.

Education
Pendleton County High School, just north of Falmouth, is the public high school. It currently is home to fewer than 1,000 students. The mascot for PCHS is the Wildcat, and the school colors are red, black and white. The school features two gyms and a 450-seat auditorium.

Other schools in the county are Sharp Middle School, named for Phillip Allen Sharp, American geneticist and molecular biologist and winner of the Nobel Prize in Physiology or Medicine (1993) and National Medal of Science (2004), located between Falmouth and Butler, Northern Elementary in Butler, and Southern Elementary in Falmouth.

Library
Pendleton County Public Library is located at 801 Robbins Avenue, Falmouth. The library provides public access computers with high speed internet and free wifi. The library also offers copying, a fax service, and a public meeting room that can be reserved.

Politics

Culture
Pendleton County is home to The Kentucky Wool Festival, Griffin Center Amphitheater, and Kincaid Regional Theatre.

 Phillip Allen Sharp, who earned the Nobel Prize for work that fundamentally changed scientists' understanding of the structure of genes, is a native of Falmouth.
 J. M. Lelen was pastor of St. Francis Xavier Roman Catholic Church in Falmouth for many years in the first half of the 20th century.
 Beth Broderick, actress on Sabrina, the Teenage Witch was born in Falmouth. 
 Nate Jones was drafted in the 5th round, 179th overall, by the White Sox in the 2007 MLB Draft. He is currently with the Cincinnati Reds. 
 Samuel Thomas Hauser , born in Falmouth, was the first resident to become territorial governor of Montana and the seventh territorial governor to that date
John Merritt coached at Jackson State University from 1953 to 1962 and then at Tennessee State from 11962 through the remainder of his coaching career.

Communities
 Butler
 DeMossville
 Falmouth (county seat)

See also

 Bethel Cemetery and Church, a historic frame church 5 miles north of Falmouth
 Fryer House, an 1811 stone house, home of the Pendleton County Historical Society
 National Register of Historic Places listings in Pendleton County, Kentucky

References

External links

 
 Pendleton County Historical Images and Documents: Northern Kentucky Views
 Pendleton County Genealogy - a KYGenWeb site

 
Kentucky counties
Kentucky counties on the Ohio River
1798 establishments in Kentucky
Populated places established in 1798